Wamidh Munir born in 1961 is an Iraqi football coach and former footballer. He played as a forward. He competed in the men's tournament at the 1984 Summer Olympics.

International goals
Iraq national football team goals
Scores and results list Iraq's goal tally first.

Honours

Club
Al-Talaba
Iraqi Premier League winners (3): 1980–81, 1981–82, 1985–86

International
Palestine Cup of Nations for Youth: 1983 with Iraq U20
Merlion Cup: 1984 with Iraq

References

External links
 
Iraq - Record International Players at rsssf.com
FÚTBOL OLIMPICO 1984 at Anotandofutbol (In Spanish)

Iraqi footballers
1961 births
Living people
Iraqi Christians
Al-Talaba SC players
Iraq international footballers
Sportspeople from Baghdad
Association football forwards
Olympic footballers of Iraq
Footballers at the 1984 Summer Olympics
Iraqi football managers
Expatriate football managers in Qatar
Al-Sailiya SC managers